Khrystyna Ivanivna Soloviy (or Solovii, ; born 17 January 1993 in Drohobych, Ukraine) is a Ukrainian-Lemko folk singer.

Biography
Soloviy was born on 17 January 1993 in Drohobych into a family of choral conductors.

She moved with her family to Lviv and for three years sang Lemko's folk songs in the choir "Lemkovyna". Khrystyna is a quarter Lemko by origin. She graduated from the philological faculty of the Ivan Franko National University of Lviv.

Musical career

2013: Holos Krayiny
In 2013 Khrystyna participated in the Ukrainian version of The Voice – Holos Krayiny. She joined the team of Svyatoslav Vakarchuk and reached the semi-finals of the competition. While attending, she sang mostly Ukrainian folk songs.

2015: Zhyva voda
In 2015 Soloviy released her debut album "Zhyva voda" (Ukrainian: Жива вода; Living water) which included 12 songs (ten folk songs of Lemko and Ukrainian origin and two written by herself).

2018–present: Liubyi druh
On October, 24 Khrystyna released her second studio album "Liubyi druh" (Ukrainian: Любий друг; Dear Friend).

Discography

Studio albums 
 2015 – Zhyva voda (Жива вода)
 2018 – Liubyi druh (Любий друг)
 2021 – Rosa Ventorum I
 2021 – Rosa Ventorum II

Music videos

References

1993 births
Living people
Lemkos
People from Drohobych
Ukrainian folk singers
The Voice (franchise) contestants
21st-century Ukrainian women  singers
The Voice of Ukraine contestants